George Jackson (1 December 1808 – 6 March 1885) was a Canadian mill owner and politician from Durham, Ontario. He served as a representative in the Canadian Assembly and, after Confederation, as a Member of Parliament for the electoral district of Grey South.

Jackson was born in Fearby, Yorkshire, was educated in Yorkshire and became a merchant in the city of Durham in England. In 1844, he immigrated to Canada and purchased a mill near Hurontario (now Collingwood). He expanded and built other mills at the site.

In 1832, he married Susan Merritt.

Jackson served from 1848 to 1854 as the crown land agent for both Grey and Bruce Counties. In 1854, he was elected to represent Grey in the Canadian Assembly, and reelected several times. Jackson also served as warden for Grey County from 1858 to 1860 and reeve of Bentinck (later Durham). When the colonies of Canada were confederated, he was elected to represent the Grey South district as an MP in the House of Commons of Canada in 1867. He was defeated by George Landerkin in 1872 but was later returned to parliament, serving from 1878 until 1882.

Jackson first entered politics as a Liberal, but chose to support John A. Macdonald and became a Conservative, although from 1878 he caucused as a Liberal-Conservative. He retired from politics after being defeated in 1882 and died in 1885 at Durham.

References 

1808 births
1885 deaths
Members of the Legislative Assembly of the Province of Canada from Canada West
Conservative Party of Canada (1867–1942) MPs
Members of the House of Commons of Canada from Ontario
People from Hambleton District